Seiont is an electoral ward in the town of Caernarfon, Gwynedd, Wales, electing councillors to the town council and Gwynedd Council.

Description
The Seiont ward covers an area either side of the Afon Seiont in the southern part of the community. The ward includes the southern part of Caernarfon town centre, including Caernarfon Castle, Caernarfon railway station and the housing estates south of the A4085.

Seiont is bordered to the north by the A4085 (Constantine Road) and Caernarfon High Street, to the northwest by the Menai Strait and is surrounded to the southeast and southwest by the Bontnewydd ward.

The ward population, according to the 2011 Census, was 3,038.

Town ward
Seiont is an electoral ward to Caernarfon Town Council electing four of the seventeen town councillors.

District ward
Seiont was a ward to Arfon Borough Council (abolished 1996), electing two councillors (Independent and Plaid Cymru) at the 1987 and 1991 elections.

Gwynedd county ward
Seiont has been an electoral ward to Gwynedd Council since 1995, electing two county councillors, a mixture of Independent, Plaid Cymru, Labour Party and Llais Gwynedd representatives.

Following the death of Independent councillor Bob Anderson, a by-election was held on 7 October 2010. It was won by Llais Gwynedd's Endaf Cooke with a majority of 120 over the Plaid Cymru candidate. Cooke retained his seat at the May 2012 county council election.

At the 2017 elections Plaid Cymru regained their seat.

* = sitting councillor prior to the election

Seiont's Independent councillor Roy Owen was leader of the Independent group for ten years on the county council, until he resigned from the group in May 2017 to form the Gwynedd United Independents. Cllr Owen made the news in 2018 when he personally filled in over 90 potholes in the ward's highways, though Gwynedd Council advised him to stop.

See also
 List of electoral wards in Gwynedd
 Peblig, Caernarfon

References

Caernarfon
Gwynedd electoral wards